Blastobasis dapis is a moth in the  family Blastobasidae. It is found in Costa Rica.

The length of the forewings is 4.5–7.2 mm. The forewings are pale brown intermixed with a few brown and brownish-yellow scales. The hindwings are translucent pale brown or translucent pale brown gradually darkening towards the apex.

Etymology
The specific epithet is derived from Latin dap (meaning sacrifice).

References

Moths described in 2013
Blastobasis